Rama Pratama (born April 18, 1988) is an Indonesian footballer who currently plays for Pelita Bandung Raya in the Indonesia Super League.

References

1988 births
Association football defenders
Living people
Indonesian footballers
Liga 1 (Indonesia) players
Pelita Bandung Raya players
21st-century Indonesian people